Maika Friemann-Jennert (born 24 June 1964) is a German politician of the CDU who has been serving as a member of the Bundestag from the state of Mecklenburg-Vorpommern since 2021.

Political career 
Friemann-Jennert became a member of the Bundestag in 2021 when she replaced Karin Strenz who died. In parliament, he has since been serving on the Defence Committee.

References

External links 

 Bundestag biography 

 

1964 births
Living people
Members of the Bundestag for Mecklenburg-Western Pomerania
Female members of the Bundestag
21st-century German women politicians
Members of the Bundestag 2017–2021
Members of the Bundestag for the Christian Democratic Union of Germany